The Social-Republican Union of the Wage Earners of Chile was a Chilean left-wing political party which existed between 1925 and 1927.

The political party brought together to the miners, workers, trade unionists of socialist, corporatist and communist ideology. It was born after the resignation of Arturo Alessandri to the Presidency of the Republic in 1925.

In the presidential elections of 1925 it presented the candidacy of José Santos Salas. With the arrival of Carlos Ibáñez del Campo to the government, the members of the USRACh were exiled and persecuted. In the 1930s, many of its former militants joined the Socialist Party, the Communist Left and the Republican Confederation of Civic Action of Workers.

Results in parliamentary elections

See also
1925 Chilean presidential election

Sources

The original version of this article draws heavily on the corresponding article in the Spanish-language Wikipedia, which was accessed in the version of February 1, 2017.

Socialist parties in Chile
Defunct political parties in Chile
Presidential Republic (1925–1973)
1925 establishments in Chile
1927 disestablishments in Chile
Political parties established in 1925
Political parties disestablished in 1927